Darin Lee Brooks (born May 27, 1984) is an American actor. He is best known for portraying Max Brady on the NBC daytime soap opera Days of Our Lives, Alex Moran on the Spike TV series Blue Mountain State, and Wyatt Spencer on the CBS soap opera The Bold and the Beautiful.

Early life
Brooks was born and raised in Honolulu, Hawaii. Brooks graduated from Henry J. Kaiser High School in 2002. He is of Polish descent.

Career
Brooks started his acting career with the theater program at his high school. He played Rapunzel's prince in his high school's production of Into the Woods. He later enrolled in acting classes, began modeling, and worked as an extra in films. He was discovered by casting director Kathy Henderson.

When Brooks moved to Los Angeles, California, he called Henderson immediately, took acting classes at the renowned Ivana Chubbuck Studios, and got an agent. Two years after the move, he auditioned for the soap operas One Life to Live and The Young and the Restless, and he was cast as Max Brady on the NBC's Days of Our Lives. He later starred as Alex Moran on the Spike TV series Blue Mountain State. In 2010, Brooks starred as Mr. Blake Owens on the web series Miss Behave. In June 2013, Brooks began playing Wyatt Spencer on the CBS soap opera The Bold and the Beautiful.

Personal life
Brooks enjoys playing the guitar, bass guitar, and drums. In 2010, he started dating actress Kelly Kruger. In February 2014, they partnered with an organization called Aid Still Required. On March 21, 2016, he and Kruger got married. In April 2019, it was announced that he and Kruger were expecting their first child. The couple's first child was born on September 22, 2019. In August 2021, it was announced that he and Kruger were expecting their second child.

Filmography

Awards and nominations

References

External links

1984 births
21st-century American male actors
American male soap opera actors
American male television actors
American people of Polish descent
Daytime Emmy Award winners
Daytime Emmy Award for Outstanding Younger Actor in a Drama Series winners
Living people
Male actors from Honolulu
Male actors from Hawaii
Male actors from Texas
People from Frisco, Texas